Gaogang District is one of three districts of Taizhou, Jiangsu province, China.

Administrative divisions
In the present, Gaogang District has 3 subdistricts and 5 towns.
3 subdistricts
 Kou'an
 Diaopu
 Xuzhuang

5 towns
 Yong'anzhou
 Baima
 Yexu
 Huzhuang
 Dasi

References
www.xzqh.org

External links 

County-level divisions of Jiangsu
Taizhou, Jiangsu